Sultan Giyas al-Din Mohammed Öz Beg, better known as Uzbeg, Uzbek or Ozbeg (1282–1341), was the longest-reigning khan of the Golden Horde (1313–1341), under whose rule the state reached its zenith. He was succeeded by his son Tini Beg. He was the son of Toghrilcha and grandson of Mengu-Timur, who had been khan of the Golden Horde from 1267 to 1280. Hence, he was a direct descendant of Genghis Khan.

Öz Beg Khan moved his residence to Mukhsha (today a village of Narovchat in Penza Oblast).

Coronation and conversion to Islam by the horde 

Öz Beg's father Togrilcha was one of the Genghisid princes that overthrew Tode-Mengu (r. 1280–1287). Later, he was executed by his brother Toqta (1291–1312). Toqta took Togrilcha's widow for wife and sent his son Öz Beg to exile in a distant region of the Golden Horde: either Khorazm or the country of Circassians.

Converted to Islam by Ibn Abdul Hamid, a Sunni Sufi Bukharan sayyid and sheikh of the Yasavi order, Öz Beg assumed the throne upon the death of his uncle Toqta in January 1313 with the help of the former Khans' vizier Temur Qutlugh and of Bulaghan (or Bayalun) khatun. At first, many Mongol nobles were against him and organized a plot to kill the new khan. Öz Beg discovered the plot and crushed the rebels. His adoption of Islam as a state religion led to a conspiracy of Shamanist and Buddhist princes, whom he subdued severely. Öz Beg determinedly spread Islam among the Golden Horde and allowed missionary activities to expand in the surrounding regions. Öz Beg found out that his competitor was backed by the envoys of the Great Khan Ayurbarwada Buyantu and this fact helped deteriorate his relationship with the Yuan dynasty. The last of his rebellious relatives was shamanist Ilbasan of the eastern half of the Golden Horde, who was murdered in 1320. Öz Beg installed the Muslim Mubarak Khwaja as a replacement to the throne of the White Horde, but he discouraged their independence. In the long run, Islam enabled the Khan to eliminate inter-factional struggles in the Horde and to stabilize state institutions. Russian scholar Lev Gumilev wrote that in this manner was Öz Beg able to turn the khanate into a sultanate. From Öz Beg onwards, the khans of the Golden Horde were all Muslim.

Öz Beg was very tolerant of Christians as exemplified by a letter of thanks he received from Pope John XXII in which the Christian leader thanked Öz Beg for his kind treatment of Christians.  Öz Beg had sent a letter to the Metropolitan Peter which stated:By the will and power, the greatness and most high! Let no man insult the metropolitan church of which Peter is head, or his service or his churchman; let no man seize their property, goods or people, let no man meddle in the affairs of the church...Their laws, their churches and monasteries and chapels shall be respected; whoever condemns or blames this religion, shall not be allowed to excuse himself under any pretext, but shall be punished with death.

Reign

Military and politics 

Öz Beg maintained one of the largest armies in the world, which exceeded 300,000 warriors. He employed his military clout to conduct campaigns against the Ilkhanate in Azerbaijan in 1319, 1325 and 1335. Ilkhanid commander Chupan repulsed one Öz Beg's first two attempts and even invaded deep into the Jochid Ulus in 1325. Öz Beg found an ally against the Ilkhanids in Mamluk Egypt; indeed, one of Cairo's squares was named after him. The Khan had the daughter of previous Khan's sister, Princess Tulunbuya, married to a Mamluk sultan, but she died in a few years. The khan instructed his merchants to lend 27,000 dinars to the Mamluk ambassador in order to finance the feast for the bride at Sarai. Soon after Öz Beg was disappointed with the Mamluk sultan's divorce with Tulunbuya and indecisiveness regarding the joint invasion of Ilkhanate. In 1323, a peace treaty was signed between Egypt and the Ilkhanate. This situation nullified the alliance and the Mamluks refused to invade the Ilkhanate. Öz Beg's next incursion coincided with Abu Said's death. However, the weather turned bad and the new Ilkhan Arpa Ke'un came with a large force; Öz Beg's army was forced to withdraw.

Prior to and during the Esen Buqa–Ayurbarwada war, Chagatai Khan Esen Buqa I attempted to gain the support of Öz Beg Khan against Ayurbarwada Buyantu Khan, the Great Khan of the Mongol Empire and the Emperor of the Yuan dynasty, in 1313 and 1316. Esen Buqa warned Öz Beg that the Great Khan would overthrow him from the throne of the Horde and install another Khan from the Jochids instead. But Öz Beg's vizier convinced him not to believe this and the Khan refused to help Esen Buqa. Nevertheless, remembering their support for the rival claimant to his throne, Öz Beg tried his best to eliminate every influence and inspiration of the Yuan dynasty on the Golden Horde in the early part of his reign. The Khan's diplomatic relationship with the Yuan, however, improved in 1324. Ayurbarwada Buyantu Khan granted him the de jure rights to rule the Golden Horde (Ulus of Jochi in the Yuan sources). By the 1330s, Öz Beg had begun sending tribute to the Mongol Yuan Emperors and received his share from Jochid possessions in China and Mongolia in exchange.

Öz Beg was engaged in wars with Bulgaria and the Byzantine Empire from 1320 to 1332. He repeatedly raided Thrace, partly in service of tsar Michael Shishman of Bulgaria war against both Byzantium and Serbia that began in 1319. His armies pillaged Thrace for 40 days in 1324 and for 15 days in 1337, taking 300,000 captives. After Öz Beg's death in 1341, his successors did not continue his aggressive policy and contact with Bulgaria lapsed. His attempt to reassert Mongol control over Serbia was unsuccessful in 1330. Byzantine Emperor Andronikos III  purportedly gave his illegitimate daughter in marriage to Öz Beg but relations turned sour at the end of Andronikos's reign, and the Mongols mounted raids on Thrace between 1320 and 1324 until the Byzantine port of Vicina Macaria was occupied by the Mongols. Andronikos's daughter, who adopted the name Bayalun, managed to escape back to the Byzantine Empire, apparently fearing her forced conversion to Islam. In the south-east of the Kingdom of Hungary, Wallachia and its ruler Basarab I  became an independent power with the support of Öz Beg after 1324.

Öz Beg allowed Genoese merchants and mariners, who had been harassed by Tokhta, to settle in Crimea. But the Mongols sacked Sudak under Khan Öz Beg in 1322 as a result of a clash between Christians and Muslims in the city. The Genoese merchants in the other towns were not molested in 1322. The Pope himself intervened and asked Öz Beg to restore the Roman Catholic churches that were destroyed in revenge, because of the Christian clash against Muslims in the city. Öz Beg was friendly towards the Pope and exchanged letters and gifts. Khan Öz Beg signed a new trade treaty with the Genoese in 1339 and allowed them to rebuild the walls of Caffa. In 1332 he had allowed the Venetians to establish a colony at Tanais on the Don.

New Sarai 

During the reign of Öz Beg, Sarai (literally meaning "palace" in  Turkish and a hotel / inn / temporary residence in Persian and Urdu) was more quickly becoming a main commercial center and industrial trading center of the country rather than just a political center. The expression of Mongol camp mentality, following Ash and the nearby absence of some structures.

To successfully spread Islam, it was necessary to build a mosque and other "elaborate places" like baths, an important element of Muslim culture. Sarai attracted merchants from European, Asian and Islamic countries as well as Middle East. Slave trade flourished due to strengthening ties with Mamluk Sultanate. Successful commercial revolutions require new markets and caravans: "places where merchants find their way." Growth of wealth and increasing needs of production always stimulate population growth. This did not suffice solely in Sarai. The accretion of the dwellings in the region transformed the capital into the center of a large Muslim government, giving it the appropriate aspect and status. Öz Beg actually came to build a new city, which received the official name Saray al-Jedid or New Sarai.

Relationship with Russian princes 

Öz Beg supported the earliest princes of Muscovy—his brother-in-law Yury of Moscow (or Yuri) and Yury's successor Ivan Kalita (or Ivan Daniilovich, later, Ivan I of Moscow)—against their relatives, the westward-leaning Princes of Tver. Four of these latter rulers—Mikhail of Tver, his sons Dmitry (or Dmitri; nicknamed The Terrible Eyes) and Alexander Mikhailovich, (or Aleksandr) and his grandson Theodor (or Fyodor)—were all killed in Sarai at Öz Beg's behest.

In 1317, Mikhail Yaroslavich defeated Yuri at a village called Bortenevo. Mikhail captured Yuri's wife, Konchaka, who was the Khan's sister. Unluckily, Konchaka died when she was in the custody of Mikhail; Yuri announced to the Khan that she had been poisoned by order of Mikhail. He and Yuri were summoned to the court of Golden Horde for a trial, after which Mikhail was beheaded in December 1318.

Following Yury's machinations, which prompted the Khan to grant the yarlik (patent of office for the title of Grand Prince of Vladimir) to Moscow and led to their father's execution by the Horde, Dmitry and his brother, Alexander, fought a series of battles with Yury and intrigued against him at the Horde, culminating in Dmitry's acquisition of the yarlik of office for the grand princely throne in 1322, after he had persuaded the khan that Yury had appropriated a large portion of the tribute due to the Horde. Yury was summoned to the Horde in Sarai for a trial but, before any formal investigation, was killed by Dmitry, November 21, 1325. Öz Beg waited to punish Dmitri and eventually he arrested the Prince of Tver for the murder, executing him in 1326.

When the Khan's cousin, the baskak Shevkal, and his Tatars were killed in Tver and a rebellion erupted there in mid-August 1327, Dmitry's successor as Prince of Tver and Grand Prince of Vladimir-Suzdal, his brother Alexander Mikhailovich, fled first to Novgorod—which turned him away—and then to Pskov—which made him its Prince—in order to escape a punitive expedition of 50,000 Mongol-Tatars & Muscovites, which was headed by his cousin, Yury's brother & successor Ivan Daniilovich. Tver's uprising against the Horde was bloodily suppressed by the Muscovite and Tatar forces in 1327. Öz Beg appointed Ivan to position of Grand Duke of Vladimir in 1332; that marked the true beginning of the rise of the Muscovites. Alexander, after many travails, including exile in Sweden & Lithuania, eventually prospered in Pskov, under the patronage of Gediminas, Grand Duke of Lithuania.
He sent his son Fyodor to the Horde, with tribute and seeking forgiveness, in 1335; the Khan pardoned Alexander and he was given the princely yarlik to Tver once again in 1337.  Unfortunately, his greatest enemy, his cousin Ivan, once more set the Horde's Khan against him with the aid of intrigue. Alexander was summoned to the Horde again and was executed at the hand of Khan Öz Beg; Tver was then pillaged and many of its citizens massacred.
 
Öz Beg welcomed Ivan's sons and made Simeon Grand Prince (duke) in 1340. Simeon was given more powers by the Khan to counter Lithuania's growing power. Öz Beg also launched military expeditions into Lithuania, as it was clear that it threatened Mongol dominance in Russia.

Relationship with Ruthenian princes

After Öz Beg's army killed Lev II and his brother Andrey (co-kings of Galicia-Volhynia, and last of the Rurikid dynasty) in 1323, the Grand Duchy of Lithuania and the Kingdom of Poland had access to control over Galicia-Volhynia. The Lithuanians defeated the Rus' boyars and occupied Kiev and its surrounding areas. In 1337, the joint Russian and Horde army penetrated to Lublin. At the request of the Galician nobleman Dmytro Dedko, the khan sent 40,000 cavalries against King Casimir III, which was divided into the Vistula.

Family

Öz Beg married several wives and concubines. It is not always possible to determine which mother gave birth to which child.

Wives:
 Bulughan Khatun (c. 1312) — widow of Toghrilcha and Toqta
 Bayalun Khatun the Elder (d. 1323)
 Taydula Khatun (d. 1360) — originally a Christian?
 Kebek Khatun — daughter of Amir Nanghiday
 Bayalun Khatun the Younger — (likely illegitimate) daughter of Andronikos III Palaiologos
 Orduja Khatun — daughter of amir-e ulus Isa Beg
 Sheritumgha Khatun

Sons:
 Timur Beg (d. 1330)
 Tini Beg (r. 1341–1342) (by Taydula Khatun)
 Jani Beg (r. 1342–1357) (by Taydula Khatun)
 Khiḍr Beg (d. 1342)
 Tulun Beg 
 Iran Beg (father of Kildi Beg)

Daughters:
 İt Küchüjük (by Bayalun Khatun the Elder) — married to amir-e ulus Isa Beg
 A daughter (by Bayalun Khatun the Elder?) — married to Amir Ali b. Arzaq
 A daughter (by Taydula Khatun?) — married to Harun Beg, son of Amir Qutlu Temür

Personality

Many Arab and Persian authors of the 14th–15th centuries described Öz Beg Khan as an able statesman and a good-hearted, caring person. Ibn Battuta, for instance, who was granted a personal audience with him in 1333, highly praised the Khan and wrote the following: "He is one of those seven kings who are the greatest and most powerful kings of the world." Historian al-Mufaddal described him as a young man of good appearance, excellent character, a fine Muslim, brave and energetic. Geographer and historian Al-Ayni wrote: "He was a brave and courageous man, religious and pious, revered jurists, loved scientists, listened to them, trusted them, was merciful to them, visited the sheikhs and did good deeds to them."

Al-Birzali, for example, wrote: "When this king Tokhta died, Öz Beg Khan, a man of about thirty years old, reigned after him. He professed Islam, was distinguished by his intelligence, good looks and figure." He also wrote: "a young man of good appearance, good temper, an excellent Muslim and a brave man." Turkmen historian Adh-Dhahabi speaks of him in the same manner: "... a brave hero, handsome in appearance, a Muslim, who destroyed many emirs and wizards." Even the Persian historian Wassaf, who is thought to have been unfriendly to Öz Beg Khan, spoke of him with great praise: "The pious prince Öz Beg... possesses divine faith and royal splendor."

The name "Öz Beg" was of Turkic origin and had been mentioned in the Middle East even before the campaigns of Genghis Khan. This name is found in Osama Bin Munqidh's "Book of Edification" that describes the events that took place in Iran under the Seljuqs. Author notes that one of the generals of the army of the ruler of Hamadan, Bursuq, in 1115–1116, was the "emir of the troops" – Öz Beg – the ruler of Mosul. According to Rashid al-Din Hamadani, the last representative of the Ildegizid Turkic dynasty, who ruled in Tabriz, was called Öz Beg Muzaffar (1210–1225).

Notes

References
 Atwood, Christopher P. Encyclopedia of Mongolia and the Mongol Empire. New York: Facts On File, 2004.
 Bor, Zhu̇gdėriĭn. Mongol khiĭgėėd Evroaziĭn diplomat shastir. Ulaanbaatar: [Olon Ulsyn Kharilt︠s︡aany Surguulʹ], 2001. 
 Gibb, H. A. R. (trans.), The Travels of Ibn Baṭṭūṭa A. D. 1325–1354. Vol. 2. Cambridge, 1962.
 Howorth, H. H., History of the Mongols from the 9th to the 19th Century. Part II.1. London, 1880.
 Morgan, David. The Mongols. Oxford: Blackwell, 1990.
 Vohidov, Š. H. (trans.), Istorija Kazahstana v persidskih istočnikah. 3. Muˤizz al-ansāb. Almaty, 2006.
 Seleznëv, J. V., Èlita Zolotoj Ordy: Naučno-spravočnoe izdanie, Kazan', 2009.
 Zimonyi, I., "Ibn Baṭṭūṭa on the First Wife of Özbeg Khan," Central Asiatic Journal 49 (2005) 303–309.

See also
List of Khans of the Golden Horde

1282 births
1341 deaths
Khans of the Golden Horde
Mongol Empire Muslims
Converts to Islam
14th-century monarchs in Asia
Byzantine–Bulgarian Wars
Date of birth unknown
Date of death unknown